Kimberly Colen (20 June 1957, Dallas – 2001) was a children's book author for the Scholastic book company. She wrote many books, including My Hanukkah Book, My Birthday Book, and Our Class Memory Album. She also edited the frequent graduation gift Hold Fast Your Dreams, a collection of twenty commencement speeches. Colen died in 2001 of complications from skin cancer.

The Kimberly Colen Memorial Grant was given annually in her honor by the Society of Children's Book Writers and Illustrators and her family, to one or two promising children's author looking to get their first book published.

1957 births
2001 deaths
American children's writers
Deaths from skin cancer
Deaths from cancer in the United States